William Elder may refer to:
 William Elder (engraver) (fl. 1680–1700), Scottish engraver
 William Elder (Canadian politician) (1822–1883), Presbyterian clergyman, journalist and political figure in New Brunswick
 William Henry Elder (1819–1904), American archbishop
 William Wiles Elder (c. 1885 – 1960), American college football player and coach
 William Hanna Elder (1913–2006), American zoologist
 Will Elder (1921–2008), American illustrator and comic book artist
 Bill Elder (newscaster) (1938–2003), American news anchor and investigative reporter